Perinatal matrices or basic perinatal matrices, in pre-perinatal and transpersonal psychology, is a theoretical model of describing the state of awareness before and during birth.

See also
 Perinatal psychology
 Transpersonal psychology

Transpersonal studies
New Age practices